The Sloan-Raymond-Fitch House is a historic house at 224 Danbury Road in Wilton, Connecticut.  It is a -story wood-frame structure, five bays wide, with a side-gable roof and a large central chimney.  A smaller two-story ell extends to the rear.  The main block is evaluated to have been built sometime between 1760 and 1780, based on the construction methods used, while the ell is believed to be an older structure.  The building has undergone some form of restorative work on several occasions, but has retained a significant amount of its original workmanship, and is a well-preserved 18th-century structure.  The house has been moved from its original location.  It is now on the same property as the Betts-Sturges-Blackmar House, and is part of a museum complex operated by the Wilton Historical Society.

The house was listed on the National Register of Historic Places in 1982.

See also
National Register of Historic Places listings in Fairfield County, Connecticut

References

External links
 Wilton Historical Society

Houses on the National Register of Historic Places in Connecticut
Houses completed in 1772
Houses in Fairfield County, Connecticut
Buildings and structures in Wilton, Connecticut
National Register of Historic Places in Fairfield County, Connecticut
Museums in Fairfield County, Connecticut
Historic house museums in Connecticut